Ebrach is a community in the Upper Franconian district of Bamberg.

Ebrach may also refer to various rivers in Bavaria, Germany:
Ebrach (Attel), a tributary of the Attel
Rauhe Ebrach, a tributary of the Regnitz near Pettstadt
Reiche Ebrach, a tributary of the Regnitz near Hirschaid
Mittlere Ebrach, a tributary of the Rauhe Ebrach
Ebrach (Reiche Ebrach), also called Geiselwinder Ebrach, tributary of the Reiche Ebrach